Each fall, the Harvard Law Review publishes a survey of the past Supreme Court term. This is a partial list of legal academics who have contributed a Foreword.
 1959 Henry M. Hart, Jr., "The Time Chart of the Justices"
 1960 Alexander Bickel, "The Passive Virtues"
 1996 Charles Black, "'State Action,' Equal Protection, and California's Proposition 14"
 1971 Gerald Gunther
 1973 Laurence Tribe
 1974 Henry Monaghan, "Constitutional Common Law"
 1976 Kenneth Karst, "Equal Citizenship Under the Fourteenth Amendment"
 1977 Bernard Schwartz
 1978 John Hart Ely, "On Discovering Fundamental Values"
 1979 Owen Fiss, "The Forms of Justice"
 1979 Archibald Cox
 1980 Lawrence Sager
 1981 Abram Chayes
 1982 Robert Cover, "Nomos and Narrative"
 1983 Frank Easterbrook
 1984 Derrick Bell
 1985 Frank Michelman
 1986 Martha Minow
 1987 Richard Epstein
 1988 Erwin Chemerinsky
 1989 Robin West
 1990 Guido Calabresi
 1991 Kathleen Sullivan
 1992 Morton Horwitz, "The Constitution of Change: Legal Fundamentality Without Fundamentalism"
 1993 William Eskridge
 1994 Charles Fried
 1995 Cass Sunstein
 1996 R. H. Fallon
 1997 Michael Dorf
 1998 Mark Tushnet
 1999 Akhil Amar
 2000 Larry Kramer
 2001 Aharon Barak
 2002 Robert Post
 2003 Richard Pildes, "The Constitutionalization of Democratic Politics"
 2004 Richard Posner
 2005 Frederick Schauer
 2006 Martha Nussbaum
 2007 Lani Guinier
 2008 Adrian Vermeule
 2009 Heather Gerken, "Federalism All the Way Down"
 2010 Dan Kahan, "Neutral Principles, Motivated Cognition, And Some Problems for Constitutional Law"
 2011 Pam Karlan, "Democracy and Disdain"
 2012 Reva Siegel, "Equality Divided"
 2013 John F. Manning, "The Means of Constitutional Power"

Supreme Court of the United States
Harvard Law School